Lichtebach (in its lower course also: Wöstenbach) is a river of North Rhine-Westphalia, Germany. It flows into the Lutter near Harsewinkel.

See also
List of rivers of North Rhine-Westphalia

References

Rivers of North Rhine-Westphalia
Rivers of Germany